The Chief Adviser was the head of the Caretaker Government of the People's Republic of Bangladesh who served as the Head of Government for 90 days during transition between one elected government to another during the term of the caretaker government. The Caretaker Government was mandated only to hold the Parliamentary Elections in Bangladesh. The Chief Adviser headed an Advisory Committee comprising ten Advisers. With powers roughly equivalent to those of the Prime Minister of an elected government, his executive power was constrained with certain constitutional limitations. He, as well as the other advisers, were selected from politically neutral individuals so as to be acceptable to all major political parties.

History 
The Caretaker government system of Bangladesh was introduced in 1991 through the passage of the 13th amendment to the constitution. The system was formed to hold democratic elections after military dictator, Hussain Muhammad Ershad, was removed from power. The amendment recommended making the last retired chief justice the chief adviser. In 1996 Justice Muhammad Habibur Rahman was appointed the Chief Adviser of the caretaker government. He along with the President of Bangladesh, Abdur Rahman Biswas, prevented the 1996 Bangladesh coup d'état attempt. The Bangladesh Nationalist Party had some difficult appointing a Chief adviser to the caretaker government which lead to the 2006–08 Bangladeshi political crisis.  The Bangladesh Nationalist Party appointed President Iajuddin Ahmed the Chief Adviser to the Caretaker government but he faced demands for resignation from Bangladesh Awami League. Iajuddin Ahmed was replaced by Fakhruddin Ahmed. During the crises the military-backed caretaker government was led by Chief Adviser Fakhruddin Ahmed. Fakhruddin Ahmed appointed three special assistants to himself who were given the rank of a state minister. The assistants were Barrister Debashis Roy, Brigadier General M. A. Malek, and Professor M Tamim. There was some debate about the constitutional validity of the assistant to the Chief Advisers.

The Caretaker government system was scrapped along with the 13th amendment in 2011 through the passage of the 15th amendment of the constitution to allow the elected government to conduct any General Election in future. Past Chief Justice of Bangladesh Mr. Justice A.B.M. Khairul Haque, who was the 19th Chief Justice of Bangladesh when he delivered the verdict which declared the Caretaker Government illegal and unconstitutional.

Composition of the Non-Party Care-taker Government

 Non-Party Care-Taker Government shall consist of the Chief Adviser at its head and ten or fewer other Advisers, all of whom shall be appointed by the President.
 The Chief Adviser and other Advisers shall be appointed within fifteen days after Parliament is dissolved or stands dissolved, and during the period between the date on which Parliament is dissolved or stands dissolved and the date on which the Chief Adviser is appointed, the Prime Minister and his cabinet who were in office immediately before Jatiyo Sangshad (Parliament) was dissolved or stood dissolved shall continue to hold office as such.
 The President shall appoint as Chief Adviser the person who among the retired Chief Justice of Bangladesh retired last and who is qualified to be appointed as an Adviser under this article: Provided that if such retired Chief Justice is not available or is not willing to hold the office of Chief Adviser, the President shall appoint as Chief Adviser the person who among the retired Chief Justice of Bangladesh retired next before the last retired Chief Justice.
 If no retired Chief Justice is available or willing to hold the office of Chief Adviser, the President shall appoint as Chief Adviser the person who among the retired Judges of the Appellate Division retired last and who is qualified to be appointed as an Adviser under this article: Provided that if such retired Judge is not available or is not willing to hold the office of Chief Adviser, the President shall appoint as Chief Adviser the person who among the retired Judges of the Appellate Division retired next before the last such retired Judge.
 If no retired judge of the Appellate Division is available or willing to hold the office of Chief Adviser, the President shall, after consultation, as far as practicable, with the major political parties, appoint the Chief Adviser from among citizens of Bangladesh who are qualified to be appointed as Advisers under this article.
 Notwithstanding anything contained in this Chapter, if the provisions of clauses (3), (4) and (5) cannot be given effect to, the President shall assume the functions of the Chief Adviser of the Non-Party Care-taker Government in addition to his own functions under this Constitution.
 The President shall appoint Advisers from among the persons who are 
 qualified for election as members of parliament; 
 not members of any political party or of any organisation associated with or affiliated to any political party; 
 not, and have agreed in writing not to be, candidates for the ensuing election of members of parliament;
 not over seventy-two years of age.
 The Advisers shall be appointed by the President on the advice of the Chief Adviser.
 The Chief Adviser or an Adviser may resign his office by writing under his hand addressed to the President.
 The Chief Adviser or an Adviser shall cease to be Chief Adviser or Adviser if he is disqualified to be appointed as such under this article.
 The Chief Adviser shall have the status, and shall be entitled to the remuneration and privileges, of a Prime Minister and an Adviser shall have the status, and shall be entitled to the remuneration and privileges, of a Minister.
 The Non-Party Care-taker Government shall stand dissolved on the date on which the Prime Minister enters upon his office after the constitution of the new parliament.

List of Chief Advisers of Bangladesh

References

External links
 Khairul Haque made CJ 

Government of Bangladesh
Caretaker governments